Midland & Scottish Air Ferries was Scotland's first airline, operating from 1933 to 1934. It is particularly noted for pioneering flights to the Inner Hebrides

History

Foundation
John Cuthill Sword started Midland Bus Services in Airdrie, to the east of Glasgow in 1924, and it grew into a substantial concern, operating over 500 buses. He was a pioneer of diesel engines for motor transport vehicles. In 1929 Midland Bus Services was merged into Scottish Transport, which in June 1932 was renamed Western SMT, part of the Scottish Motor Traction (SMT) company based in Edinburgh. As a result, Sword was paid around £290,000 for his company, became general manager of Western SMT, and was appointed to the SMT board.

SMT,  in which the London and North Eastern Railway (LNER) held a stake, had itself been active in aviation; from July to October 1932 it had operated several aircraft which it used for route surveying and pleasure flights. It had also been granted licences to fly between Newcastle and the north of Scotland. Notwithstanding that, on 10 March 1933  Sword, with his wife Christina, founded their own airline, Midland & Scottish Air Ferries (M&SAF), with £20,000 capital. He is reported to have believed that "so long as the main-line railway routes are avoided there are air-service prospects in this small country of ours". His plans focused on over-water routes from Glasgow.

John Sword had already ordered several aircraft, the first to be delivered to his base at Glasgow's Renfrew Airport being De Havilland Fox Moth G-ACBZ, which arrived on 8 February. Airspeed Ferry G-ACBT came fresh from the manufacturer's factory in York on 12 February. Sword ordered a second Ferry and three more Fox Moths the same month – his total investment in aircraft costing £12,000.

He was also assembling his staff. He hired SMT's chief pilot Harold Malet and their chief engineer Sandy Jack. He also hired Johnny Rae (a De Havilland test pilot), Jimmy Orrell (an ex RAF fighter pilot, later to become chief test pilot of Avro), Michael Noel Mavrogordato (ex De Havilland) and Winnie Drinkwater, all qualified engineers and pilots. Drinkwater was an enthusiastic pilot and engineer, newly qualified and only nineteen years of age when Sword took her on, the world's first female commercial pilot. Her elder sister Mary was appointed receptionist and book-keeper, soon to become company secretary.

Operations

Soon after the delivery of his first Airspeed Ferry, Sword put it to work on a temporary service linking Castle Bromwich Aerodrome with Liverpool (Hooton Park) and with London's Heston Airport in connection with the British Industries Fair from 19 February to 2 March 1933, an operation he repeated for the following year's Fair, again with the Ferries.  The 1933 event took place before Sword's airline was formed.
 
The airline's first operational flight took place on 18 April 1933. Johnny Rae and Jimmy Orrell flew Dragons G-ACCU and G-ACCT from Renfrew to The Strath, a farmer's field near Campbeltown, later known as Strathfield. They carried company officials, press, a photographer, and newspapers, and were welcomed by a delegation of local dignitaries. This was the start of daily services (except Sundays). On the 20th, a Fox Moth flown by Jimmy Rae went on from Campbeltown to take newspapers to Bowmore on Islay. Winifred Drinkwater flew the route on the 27th in Fox Moth G-ACBZ, the world's first commercial flight piloted by a woman. G-ACBT made the first Airspeed Ferry flight to Campbeltown on 11 May.

Sword ordered a new Dragon, G-ACCZ, with adaptations to carry stretchers, and told local hospitals of his plan. The aircraft arrived on 14 May, and the next day the first call came in to take a seriously ill fisherman from Bridgend, Islay, to Glasgow. The patient was accompanied by a Glaswegian nurse who was holidaying on Islay, and the trip was made successfully – Scotland's first official air ambulance flight.

The Campbeltown service was officially extended to Bridgend on Islay from 16 May 1933.

On 18 May a navy vessel, heavy cruiser HMS Frobisher, with a crew of 700 arrived in Campbeltown Loch and ordered bread from a bakery in Glasgow which was delivered by the evening flight – the airline's first freight operation.

Soon the Campbeltown service was also extended to Rothesay, and, on 31 May, to Belfast Aldergrove Airport, using the newly delivered Avro 618 Ten, G-ACGF, so called because it could carry eight passengers (plus a crew of two).This was Aldergrove's first sustained commercial route. The aircraft was later used on the direct routes from Glasgow to Belfast and to Liverpool. There were now two flights daily on these routes (except Sundays).

On 14 June 1933 Jimmy Orrell conducted a three-day survey of landing sites throughout the Hebrides in G-ACCZ, making the first landing on the beach at Traigh Mhòr, Barra, still the site of Barra's airport. However M&SAF never started services to Barra or any other Outer Hebrides islands.

Renfrew Airport was often closed by fog, so the airline used "The Meadow" airfield at Monkton, later known as Prestwick Airport, for diversions. When that happened, two Rolls-Royce Twenty cars were available to drive there to collect the passengers. If necessary, a converted REO Speed Wagon caravan could be taken there in which the airline crew or engineers could rest.

Winifred Drinkwater was kept busy, doing scheduled and air ambulance flights and charters, which included a monster-spotting flight over Loch Ness.

Sword now turned his attention away from Glasgow and the Inner Hebrides, and started operations from Liverpool, first across the River Mersey at Hooton Park, then at Speke Airport as soon as that opened. His first route from Liverpool was to Dublin, starting on 1 September 1933 using the Avro Ten. Operations also started at Blackpool's Stanley Park Aerodrome, from where he started a route to the Isle of Man, and operated pleasure flights, mainly with the Fox Moths. He also set up an engineering base there.

A popular charter operation operated by the Ferries at Stanley Park was for viewing the night-time Illuminations, with the airport lit by floodlight mounted on a lorry. An unusual episode occurred when a Ferry made a forced landing on the beach at Southport because of failure of an outer engine. Pilot Jimmy Orrell went to fly it back to Renfrew, and found that the ground engineer had removed the offending engine and stowed it in the cabin, to save the drag. Orrell flew the aircraft home in that condition with no problems.

After an uneventful winter, Sword was planning for expansion in 1934. On 6 April, he took delivery of a new, unique aeroplane from Avro, the model 642/2m Eighteen G-ACFV. With a sixteen-passenger capacity, this was a big step for the airline, and Sword had arranged a suitable ceremony to announce it. On that day, he collected his new aircraft from Woodford Aerodrome and flew to Castle Bromwich to pick up some of the launching party en route to Speke. There, the aircraft was named Marchioness of Londonderry by the lady herself, accompanied by her husband, Lord Londonderry who was the Secretary of State for Air. Also attending were Lt-Col Sir Francis Shelmerdine, the Director-General of Civil Aviation, and the Prime Minister, Ramsay MacDonald. After this prestigious launch, the Prime Minister and others were flown to Heston Aerodrome.

Sword was a friend of Ted Hillman, another bus operator who was running an airline, Hillman's Airways, from London's Romford airfield, and they agreed that Sword should start a service from Glasgow to London via Liverpool, and on, with Hillman's, to Paris–Le Bourget Airport. He was apparently abandoning his intention to avoid competition with the railways. The service started on 9 April 1934, twice daily except Sundays, with the Avro 642 serving along with others of Sword's fleet. The Paris service could also be accessed through a service from Belfast via the Isle of Man to Liverpool.

Demise
All the airline's activity was going on while Sword was employed as a director with SMT. The other directors of SMT, some of whom were also directors of the newly formed Railway Air Services, with whom he was now blatantly competing, now decided that things had gone too far, and gave Sword an ultimatum that he should give up either his employment with SMT or his airline. He chose the latter. Other factors contributing to this decision may have been that Sword saw little prospect of making a profit from his venture, and the crash in June of the pride of his fleet, the Avro Eighteen, may have disheartened him.

Most of the routes were stopped on 14 July 1934, with no obvious attempt to sell the airline as a going concern, the aircraft being disposed of individually over the following months. On 4 September 1934 Sword joined Eric Gandar Dower, owner of Aberdeen Airways, in a flight in the latter's Short Scion from Renfrew to Campbeltown and Islay. Gandar Dower was possibly evaluating the route with a view to taking it over, but nothing came of it. The only remaining route, to Islay, was shut down on 30 September. Midland & Scottish Air Ferries Ltd went into voluntary liquidation in February 1938.

However Sword employed Charles Almond, an instructor with the Scottish Flying Club at Renfrew, to fly Dragon G-ACJS which was retained on stand-by to perform air ambulance flights until other arrangements could be made. The aircraft was sold to Northern & Scottish Airways on 7 January 1935 and they continued the ambulance service.

Routes
From timetable dated 9 June 1934 (No Sunday services on any route)

Glasgow (Renfrew) — Liverpool (Speke) — London (Romford) — Le Bourget (twice daily)
Belfast (Aldergrove) — Isle of Man (Ronaldsway) — Liverpool — London — Le Bourget (twice daily)
Blackpool (Stanley Park) — Liverpool (twice daily)
Glasgow — Campbeltown (Strath Aerodrome) — Belfast (twice daily)
Glasgow — Campbeltown — Islay (Duich Aerodrome) (daily)
Connections
At London (Romford) with Hillman's Airways for Paris
At Liverpool with K.L.M. to Hull, Rotterdam, Hanover and Berlin

Fleet 

Livery consisted of white overall with red markings, struts, and wheel spats. The Dragons also had red engine nacelles. The font and styling of the company name varied between aircraft.

Accidents and incidents
Avro Eighteen G-ACFV and De Havilland Fox Moth G-ACCB were involved in accidents or incidents while with M&SAF – see Fleet list above.

See also
There is a film of M&SAF's Airspeed Ferry G-ACBT and Avro Ten G-ACGF, and others, giving pleasure rides at the Scottish Flying Club Pageant at Renfrew during the Summer of 1933.

 List of defunct airlines of the United Kingdom

Footnotes

References

Bibliography

Defunct airlines of the United Kingdom
Airlines established in 1933
Aviation in Scotland
Defunct airlines of Scotland